Josh Scott (born July 13, 1993) is an American professional basketball player for Utsunomiya Brex of the Japanese B.League. He played college basketball at the University of Colorado under Tad Boyle, where he was an All-Pac-12 Conference player for the Buffaloes.

College career
Scott played for the Colorado Buffaloes under coach Tad Boyle. Scott is one of just two players in Colorado history, joining CU Athletic Hall of Famer Cliff Meely, to record 1,700 points, 900 rebounds and 100 blocked shots. His name is scattered throughout the Colorado career record book ranking second in free throws made (504) and blocked shots (162), third in rebounds (974) and games started (120), fourth in free throws attempted (655), fifth in minutes played (3.761) and double-doubles (36), sixth in games played (124), eighth in scoring (1,709) and field goals made (600), 13th in field goal percentage (.519), 18th in free throw percentage (.769), 28th in steals (80) and 50th in assists (125). He was a three-time Chauncey Billups Award winner as the team's most valuable player and was also the co-winner of the 2016 CUSPY Male Career Athletic Achievement Award. One of three four-year seniors in his class (2012–16) - joining Xavier Talton and Eli Stalzer - to achieve 82 wins, the third most in team history. He scored in double digits in 95 of 124 games and also had 41 double-digit rebounding efforts.

College Statistics

|-
| style="text-align:left;"|2012–13
| style="text-align:left;"|Colorado
| 31 || 30 || 28.2 || .486|| 1.000|| .753 || 5.7 || 0.6 || 0.5 || 0.8 || 10.3
|-
| style="text-align:left;"|2013–14
| style="text-align:left;"|Colorado 
| 35 || 34 || 31.6 || .511 || .000 || .810 || 8.4 || 0.6 || 0.8 || 1.1 || 14.1
|-
| style="text-align:left;"|2014–15
| style="text-align:left;"|Colorado
| 26 || 25 || 30.8 || .544 || .250 || .752 || 8.4 || 1.1 || 0.7 || 1.8 || 14.5
|-
| style="text-align:left;"|2015–16
| style="text-align:left;"|Colorado
| 32 || 31 || 30.6 || .531 || .333 || .749 || 8.8 || 1.8 || 0.6 || 1.6 || 16.3
|-
|- class="sortbottom"
| style="text-align:center;" colspan="2"|Career
| 124 || 120 || 30.3 || .519 || .313 || .770 || 7.9 || 1.0 || 0.6 || 1.3 || 13.8

Professional career
On July 26, 2016, he signed with the Macedonian basketball team MZT Skopje.

On August 20, 2017, he signed for Shimane Susanoo Magic.

The Basketball Tournament (TBT) (2017–present) 
During the summer of 2017, Scott played in The Basketball Tournament on ESPN for Team Colorado (Colorado Alumni).  He competed for the $2 million prize, and for Team Colorado, as a No. 1 seed in the West Region, Scott helped take Team Colorado to the Super 16 Round, but was defeated by Armored Athlete 84–75.

Career statistics

Europe

|-
| align="left" | 2016-17
| align="left" | KK MZT Skopje
| 32 || 17 || 25.4 || .621 || .000 || .736 || 6.9 || 0.9 || 0.5 || 1.3 ||  12.2
|-
| align="left" | 2017-18
| align="left" | Shimane Susanoo Magic
| 50 || 47 || 28.2 || .525 || .000 || .706 || 10.9 || 2.3 || 0.9 || 1.0 ||  18.3
|-
| align="left" | 2018-19
| align="left" | Ryukyu Golden Kings
| 17 || 17 || 31.4 || .635 || .000 || .747 || 8.53 || 1.7 || 0.8 || 0.7 ||  17.8
|-

References

External links
Colorado Buffaloes bio
ESPN.com profile

1993 births
Living people
African-American basketball players
American expatriate basketball people in Japan
American expatriate basketball people in North Macedonia
American men's basketball players
Basketball players from Colorado
Colorado Buffaloes men's basketball players
KK MZT Skopje players
Parade High School All-Americans (boys' basketball)
People from Monument, Colorado
Power forwards (basketball)
Ryukyu Golden Kings players
Shimane Susanoo Magic players
Utsunomiya Brex players
21st-century African-American sportspeople